Telegraph Pass is a highway pass on Interstate 8 through the Gila Mountains in  Yuma County, Arizona, about 19 miles (30 km) east of Yuma in the northwest Sonoran Desert. The east bound lanes of I-8 cross under the westbound freeway, briefly traveling to the left before Telegraph Pass before reverting back. In 1967, the "Telegraph Pass" freeway section of Interstate 8 (Miles 11–23) was opened.

Name 
Telegraph Pass was named after the telegraph line that ran from San Diego, California, to Maricopa Wells, Arizona, which was extended by the US Army to Prescott, Arizona, back in 1873. There is a popular hiking trail nearby that is called the Telegraph Pass Trailhead.

Geography 
Telegraph Pass has one of the oldest geological sections of the Interstate Highway System in the United States. The pass goes through via a two-tiered highway section at the north end of the Gila Mountain range showing various strata. The highway road cuts expose some of the oldest metamorphic rocks in the state of Arizona, outside of rocks exposed at the bottom of the Grand Canyon.

The bedrock (gneiss) in this range is about 1.6 to 1.8 billion years in age. The Gila mountain range formed in the past 30 million years due to a crustal extension in the Basin & Range Province.

References

See also 
East Bound View per Google Street view.
West Bound View per Google Street View.
Pass, Gila Mountains, Arizona
Interstate 8 at the Interstate Guide
Interstate 8 in California and Arizona at AA Roads

Mountain passes of Arizona
Interstate 8